Rafael Rodríguez (born 7 April 1952) is a Cuban sports shooter. He competed in the mixed 25 metre rapid fire pistol event at the 1980 Summer Olympics.

References

1952 births
Living people
Cuban male sport shooters
Olympic shooters of Cuba
Shooters at the 1980 Summer Olympics
Place of birth missing (living people)
Pan American Games medalists in shooting
Pan American Games silver medalists for Cuba
Pan American Games bronze medalists for Cuba
Shooters at the 1983 Pan American Games
Shooters at the 1991 Pan American Games
Medalists at the 1983 Pan American Games
Medalists at the 1991 Pan American Games
20th-century Cuban people